Joe Davola is the name of:
 Joe Davola (TV producer), producer of various television series
 "Crazy" Joe Davola, character on Seinfeld, named after the above producer